Inkhil is a town in southern Syria, administratively part of the al-Sanamayn District of the Daraa Governorate. It is located north of Daraa and just east of the Golan Heights in the Hauran plain. In the 2004 census by the Syria Central Bureau of Statistics it had a population 31,258.

History
Among the ancient ruins found in Inkhil are the remains of a large villa dating from the 2nd century CE during Roman rule. Within the building is large vaulted central hall which connects to several rooms containing busts and other Roman-era sculptures carved from basalt. Its facade has highly decorated entrances and conch-head niches. During Byzantine rule, Inkhil was dominated by the Ghassanids, Arab vassals of the empire based in nearby Jabiya.

In 1596 Inkhil appeared in the Ottoman tax registers under the name of Nahal, being part of the nahiya of Bani Kilab in the Sanjak of Hauran. It had an entirely Muslim population consisting of 86 households and 45 bachelors. They paid a fixed tax-rate of 40% on agricultural products, including  wheat, barley, summer crops, goats and bee-hives; in addition to occasional revenues; a total of 13,000 akçe. Most of the income (22 out of 24 parts) went to a waqf (religious trust).

The town consisted of about 50 houses in the early 1840s all of which were inhabited by Muslims.   According to German archaeologist Gottlieb Schumacher, Inkhil was recorded to be a "small place numbering 55 to 60 huts" in 1897. 

Inkhil was one of the first towns to participate in the 2011–2012 Syrian uprising against the government of Bashar al-Assad in March 2011 following demonstrations in Daraa. On 19 August 2012, four protesters were killed and dozens injured after Syrian security forces shot at demonstrators emerging from a mosque following Friday prayers.

References

Bibliography

External links
Map of town, Google Maps
 Sanameine, 19L map

Cities in Syria
Populated places in Al-Sanamayn District